John Pyne (by 1500 – 1531/32), of London, was a Member of Parliament in 1529 for Lyme Regis.

References

15th-century births
1531 deaths
English MPs 1529–1536
Members of the Parliament of England (pre-1707) for Lyme Regis